The 1988 French Grand Prix was a Formula One motor race held on 3 July 1988 at the Circuit Paul Ricard, Le Castellet. It was the seventh race of the 1988 Formula One World Championship.

The 80-lap race was won by local driver Alain Prost, driving a McLaren-Honda, after he started from pole position. Prost's Brazilian teammate Ayrton Senna finished second, with Italian Michele Alboreto third in a Ferrari.

Qualifying
The two McLarens lined up in their usual front row places, but, for the first time this season, Alain Prost was ahead of Ayrton Senna, the Frenchman beating the Brazilian by almost half a second to take his first pole since the 1986 Monaco Grand Prix and in doing so stopping his teammate from a record-breaking 7th pole in succession. The two Ferraris filled the second row, Gerhard Berger beating Michele Alboreto by over 1.1 seconds, though neither driver believed they could race with the McLarens simply because of fuel consumption. On the third row were the two normally-aspirated Benettons of Thierry Boutsen and Alessandro Nannini, while the Lotuses of Nelson Piquet and Satoru Nakajima filled the fourth row, Piquet being the last driver to qualify under 1:10. The top ten was completed by the Williams of Nigel Mansell (over 2.7 seconds slower than Prost and almost 4 seconds slower than his 1987 pole time) and the March of Ivan Capelli, who had recovered after fracturing his left foot in a crash during practice in Detroit two weeks before.

Meanwhile, Ligier had a disastrous weekend on their home turf with both René Arnoux and Stefan Johansson failing to qualify, though they did have a celebration of sorts over the weekend as Arnoux turned 40 the day after the race. Julian Bailey also failed to qualify in his Tyrrell, while Piercarlo Ghinzani qualified 22nd in his Zakspeed but was excluded for missing a weight check, thus promoting Oscar Larrauri's EuroBrun to the last grid spot.

Race summary
Prost led away from Senna and the two Ferraris, with Piquet passing the two Benettons for fifth. Despite worries in the McLaren pit about overly high fuel consumption (the fuel readouts in the cars were showing less fuel used than what the Honda telemetry was telling the team), Ron Dennis was reportedly prepared to let his drivers run out of fuel at the expense of a perfect season if it taught them to be more conservative given their obvious advantage over the field, though ultimately the onboard readouts were proved correct. Prost maintained a two-second advantage over Senna until the mid-race pit stops, while an early stop by Berger on lap 22 allowed teammate Alboreto through into third. While both McLarens were racing each other out front, they were still pulling away from the field at sometimes a second per lap.

Senna made his pit stop three laps before Prost, enabling him to take the lead thanks to a slow stop for Prost with a sticking front wheel, but traffic on the Mistral Straight (including a less than helpful Piquet who most likely enjoyed seeing Senna lose the lead to Prost at close quarters) and a gearbox problem allowed Prost to close right up to him and then overtake him on lap 61 as they lapped Alex Caffi and Pierluigi Martini at the Signes corner. Meanwhile, Berger reclaimed third only for Alboreto to pass him again during the pit stops, while Mansell suffered his seventh consecutive retirement, dropping out on lap 49 with suspension problems, though he had been dropping back for a number of laps with power loss from his Judd V8 engine. After returning to the pits and getting himself cleaned up, the Englishman left the circuit profoundly fed up with the performance of the Williams, fuelling ongoing speculation in the press that he would leave the team at the end of the year to join Ferrari after the Italian team had announced they would not be keeping Alboreto for 1989. Despite the rumours turning out to be correct, Mansell continued to deny he was joining Ferrari.

In the closing laps, Prost pulled away as Senna's gearbox troubles continued, losing several gears. The Brazilian eventually finished nearly 32 seconds behind the Frenchman, though he was still nearly 35 seconds ahead of Alboreto, the last man on the lead lap. Berger was fourth ahead of Piquet, who also suffered gearbox problems in the later stages of the race; the final point went to the Benetton of Nannini. France was the first time since the 1987 Monaco Grand Prix that Alboreto had finished in front of his teammate in a race where they both finished. During the race Alboreto had the advantage of an almost perfectly balanced car, while Berger complained of severe understeer, something not needed at the high speed Signes corner at the end of the Mistral.

The fastest lap of the race, a 1:11.737 set by Prost on lap 45, was over two seconds slower than the 1:09.548 set by Piquet in a Honda-powered Williams the previous year – a consequence of the restrictions imposed on turbocharged engines this season with the major difference being the speeds attained on the now 1 km long Mistral Straight.

For Prost it was his third win in his home Grand Prix after winning in both 1981 at Dijon (his first Grand Prix victory) and 1983 at the full length Paul Ricard. On both occasions he had been driving for the factory Renault team.

Classification

Pre-qualifying

Qualifying

Race

Championship standings after the race

Drivers' Championship standings

Constructors' Championship standings

References

French Grand Prix
French Grand Prix
Grand Prix
French Grand Prix